Konstantinos Palamaras (born 11 May 1975) is a retired Greek football defender.

References

1975 births
Living people
Greek footballers
Panionios F.C. players
Kalamata F.C. players
Super League Greece players
Association football defenders